= Rhesion =

Town in ancient Thrace

Coordinates: 40°59′03″N 28°53′31″E

Rhesion was a town of ancient Thrace, inhabited during Byzantine times.

Its site is located near Çobanayazma in European Turkey.
